Chowti Jagannatha Rao (1924 – 23 January 2012) was an Indian politician belonging to Indian National Congress, and served as the Deputy Chief Minister of Andhra Pradesh. He was very close to former prime minister PV Narasimha Rao. He belongs to Muthuraja community.

C. Jagannatha Rao served as deputy Chief Minister in the Cabinet of Bhavanam Venkatram in 1982. He was member of the Legislative Council for one term and represented Narsapur Assembly constituency in Medak district three times. He was Home Minister earlier in the Cabinet of T. Anjaiah in 1980. He was also president of Narsapur samithi in 1961. Jagannatha Rao was in the forefront of separate Telangana agitation in 1969.

See also
 List of Deputy Chief Ministers of Andhra Pradesh
List of Telugu people
Politics of Andhra Pradesh

References

Deputy Chief Ministers of Andhra Pradesh
Indian National Congress politicians from Andhra Pradesh
2012 deaths
1932 births